Anything Is Possible is a 2017 novel of related short stories by the American author Elizabeth Strout. The novel returns to the fictional rural town of Amgash, Illinois, which is the protagonist's hometown in Strout's 2016 novel My Name Is Lucy Barton. Former U.S. President Barack Obama included Anything Is Possible on a list of the best books he read in 2017. Anything is Possible won The Story Prize, a book award for short story collections.

Contents

Reception 
Anything Is Possible received positive reviews from critics, who praised Strout as a master of the novel-in-stories form, with each short story filling in a piece of her “gracefully constructed narrative puzzle.” Writing for The New York Times, Jennifer Senior said, “Strout was born to be an omniscient narrator, born to flit and swoop from one crooked perch to the next.”

References

2017 American novels
Novels set in Illinois
Novels by Elizabeth Strout
Random House books